Mycteroplus is a genus of moths of the family Noctuidae.

Species
 Mycteroplus puniceago (Boisduval, 1840)

References
Natural History Museum Lepidoptera genus database
Mycteroplus at funet

Hadeninae